Bertram Seger (30 December 1929 – 10 January 1978) was a Liechtenstein racing cyclist. He rode in the 1954 Tour de France.

References

1929 births
1978 deaths
Liechtenstein male cyclists
Place of birth missing